Edward Rigby  was a Canadian Anglican priest in the 20th Century.

Rigby was educated at the University of Toronto and ordained in 1938. After a curacy in Coboconk he was Rector of Omagh, Ontario from 1941 to 1946; on the staff of  the Diocese of Niagara  from 1946 to 1963; and Archdeacon of Niagara from 1964 to 1973.

References

Archdeacons of Niagara
University of Toronto alumni
20th-century Canadian Anglican priests